Ann McKee (born 1953) is a neuropathologist and expert in neurodegenerative disease at the New England Veterans Affairs Medical Centers (VISN-1) and is professor of neurology and pathology at Boston University School of Medicine and director of Boston University CTE Center. She is particularly known for her work studying Alzheimer's disease and the consequences of repetitive traumatic brain injury. In 2017, she was named "Bostonian of the Year" by The Boston Globe for her leading work in this area, and in 2018, Time named McKee one of its 100 most influential people.

Education
McKee earned her bachelor's degree at the University of Wisconsin and her medical degree at Case Western Reserve University School of Medicine. McKee then completed a fellowship in neuropathology at Massachusetts General Hospital and a residency in neurology at Cleveland Metropolitan General Hospital.

Career
McKee is the chief neuropathologist at New England Veterans Affairs Medical Centers (VISN-1), and director of the Boston University CTE Center and Neuropathology Core for the Boston University Alzheimer's Disease Center (BU ADC). Dr. McKee is also associate director of the BU ADC. Dr. McKee directs multiple brain banks including those for the BU ADC and Framingham Heart Study which are based at the Bedford VA, and the VA-BU-CLF and Chronic Effects of Neurotrauma Consortium brain banks which are based at VA Boston. Dr. McKee's research focuses on CTE and the late-effects of traumatic neurodegeneration.

McKee is a leading authority on chronic traumatic encephalopathy (CTE), a degenerative brain disease. CTE is most commonly found in athletes participating in boxing, American football, ice hockey, other contact sports, and military service. In 2013, she reported that she had found evidence of CTE in over 70 of the athletes that she examined, including three NHL enforcers and 18 NFL players. McKee has presented her findings to National Football League officials and testified before the United States House Judiciary Committee. She has also studied diseases including Lewy body disease, Parkinson's disease, progressive supranuclear palsy, multiple system atrophy, frontotemporal lobar degeneration, and corticobasal degeneration.

Accolades and awards
McKee has received numerous awards in recognition of her work. In 2018, the Alzheimer's Association gave her the Henry Wisniewski Lifetime Achievement Award for her work. In the same year, Time magazine named her one of the 100 Most Influential People. Chris Borland, a former linebacker for the San Francisco 49ers who retired at the age of 24 due to brain injury concerns spurred by McKee's research, said "She may have saved my life. At the very least, her work has likely spared me much of the suffering we see today among former NFL players."

Personal life
McKee has three children and lives in Massachusetts. She has a long-term boyfriend named Gary, but he is known as "Harv" by friends and family. She is a Green Bay Packers fan.

References

External links 
 Boston University CTE Center
 Publications by Ann McKee on ResearchGate
 VA Boston Healthcare System
 

1953 births
Living people
People from Appleton, Wisconsin
University of Wisconsin–Madison alumni
Case Western Reserve University alumni
Harvard University faculty
Boston University faculty
American neurologists
Women neurologists
American women neuroscientists
American neuroscientists
American pathologists
Women pathologists
Concussion activists
American women academics
21st-century American women
Members of the National Academy of Medicine